Harrisburg, a northeastern suburb of Charlotte, is a city in Cabarrus County, North Carolina, United States. The population was estimated to be 16,576 .

Geography
Harrisburg is located in southwestern Cabarrus County at  (35.322295, -80.653331). It is bordered to the north by Concord and to the west by Charlotte in Mecklenburg County.

North Carolina Highway 49 passes through the center of Harrisburg, leading northeast  to Asheboro and southwest  to the center of Charlotte.

The City of Harrisburg has a total area of 11.15 sq miles, all land.

Demographics

2020 census

As of the 2020 United States census, there were 18,967 people, 4,865 households, and 4,164 families residing in the town.

2017
As of the United States Census Bureau estimate on July 1, 2017, there were 15,728 people and 4,573 households in the town, with 3.16 persons per household. The population percent change between April 1, 2010, and July 1, 2017, was 17.9%. The racial makeup of the town was 72.2% White, 16.1% African American, 0.7% American Indian and Alaska Native, 6.4% Asian, 3.3% Hispanic or Latino and 2.8% from two or more races. There were 926 Veterans.

In 2016, the median age of all people in Harrisburg was 37.1.

In 2016, there were 4,573 households in Harrisburg, with the median property value being $245,400. The homeownership rate was 89.1%. The national average was 63.6%. The median income for a household in the town was $88,865 and the per capita income was $32,310.

Government
Harrisburg has a council-manager form of government. The Town Council is elected on a non-partisan basis every two years, and members serve staggered four-year terms with no term limits. The mayor is elected separately for a four-year term and is ex officio chair of the Town Council.  The Town Council has eight members from the community and appoints a town manager to oversee day-to-day operations.

While the Town Council is responsible for passing ordinances, the town's budget, and other policies, all decisions can be overridden by the North Carolina General Assembly, since North Carolina municipalities do not have home rule. While municipal powers have been broadly construed since the 1960s, the General Assembly still retains considerable authority over local matters.

Education
The percent of people over 25 with a high school diploma or higher was 95.6% and 44.0% for those with a bachelor's degree or higher. Local schools include Harrisburg Elementary School, Hickory Ridge Elementary School, Hickory Ridge Middle School and Hickory Ridge High School.

The largest universities by graduates near Harrisburg are, the University of North Carolina at Charlotte, Central Piedmont Community College and Rowan-Cabarrus Community College. The most common bachelor's degree concentrations are General Business Administration and Management, General Psychology and General Biological Studies.

Notable person
 Gordon Tottle (1925– 1987), professional ice hockey player

References

External links
 Town of Harrisburg official website

Towns in Cabarrus County, North Carolina
Towns in North Carolina